Pterogonium is a genus of mosses belonging to the family Leucodontaceae.

The species of this genus are found in Eurasia, Africa and Northern America.

Species:
 Pterogonium ambiguum Hook. 
 Pterogonium apiculatum (Brid.) Schwägr.

References

Hypnales
Moss genera